Masaki Nishizawa  (born February 22, 1972) is a Japanese mixed martial artist. He competed in the Flyweight and Bantamweight divisions.

Mixed martial arts record

|-
| Loss
| align=center| 1-3-2
| Masahiro Oishi
| TKO (punches)
| Shooto: To The Top 1
| 
| align=center| 1
| align=center| 4:12
| Tokyo, Japan
| 
|-
| Win
| align=center| 1-2-2
| Norio Nishiyama
| Decision (unanimous)
| Shooto: R.E.A.D. 7
| 
| align=center| 2
| align=center| 5:00
| Setagaya, Tokyo, Japan
| 
|-
| Draw
| align=center| 0-2-2
| Daiji Takahashi
| Draw
| Shooto: Gateway to the Extremes
| 
| align=center| 2
| align=center| 5:00
| Setagaya, Tokyo, Japan
| 
|-
| Loss
| align=center| 0-2-1
| Shuichiro Katsumura
| Decision (unanimous)
| Shooto: Gig '99
| 
| align=center| 2
| align=center| 5:00
| Tokyo, Japan
| 
|-
| Loss
| align=center| 0-1-1
| Masaru Gokita
| Decision (unanimous)
| Shooto: Las Grandes Viajes 6
| 
| align=center| 2
| align=center| 5:00
| Tokyo, Japan
| 
|-
| Draw
| align=center| 0-0-1
| Hiroaki Yoshioka
| Draw
| Shooto: Shooter's Dream
| 
| align=center| 2
| align=center| 5:00
| Setagaya, Tokyo, Japan
|

See also
List of male mixed martial artists

References

1972 births
Japanese male mixed martial artists
Flyweight mixed martial artists
Bantamweight mixed martial artists
Living people